Adoniram Judson "Jud" Birchall (September 12, 1855 – December 22, 1887) was an American Major League Baseball player who played left field for the Philadelphia Athletics in the American Association for three seasons from  to .
  
Birchall died at the age of 32 of a pulmonary ailment, and is interred at Milestown Baptist Church Cemetery in Philadelphia.

References

External links

Jud Birchall's Obituary at TheDeadBallEra

 Jud Birchall at SABR (Baseball BioProject)

Baseball players from Philadelphia
Major League Baseball left fielders
Philadelphia Athletics (AA) players
19th-century baseball players
19th-century deaths from tuberculosis
Philadelphia (minor league baseball) players
New Bedford (minor league baseball) players
New Haven (minor league baseball) players
Hartford (minor league baseball) players
Baltimore (minor league baseball) players
Philadelphia Athletics (minor league) players
Newark Domestics players
1855 births
1887 deaths
Burials in Pennsylvania
Tuberculosis deaths in Pennsylvania